Jonathan "John" Davies (born 8 January 1991) is an English professional rugby league footballer who plays as a  forward for Featherstone Rovers in the Betfred Championship.

Background 
Davies was born in Castleford, West Yorkshire, England.

Career 
Davies has previously played for amateur club Castleford Lock Lane, Super League team Castleford (Heritage № 905), and Championship side Batley. In his youth career, he represented England schools and the Yorkshire academy team.

References

External links 

 Featherstone Rovers profile
 Castleford Tigers profile
 Statistics at thecastlefordtigers.co.uk

1991 births
Living people
Batley Bulldogs players
Castleford Tigers players
Dewsbury Rams players
English rugby league players
Featherstone Rovers players
Rugby league players from Castleford
Rugby league second-rows
Sheffield Eagles players
York City Knights players